Emerge America is a non-profit national political organization based in San Francisco with the mission to increase the number of Democratic women leaders from diverse background in public office through recruitment, training and providing a powerful network.

Background 
Andrea Dew Steele co-founded the original affiliate, Emerge California, which was formed in 2002. Under Steele's leadership, Emerge was expanded nationwide in 2005. Steele resigned from her position in May 2019. 

Emerge America added affiliates in 6 states in its first year and by the 2016 presidential election, it had affiliates in 23 states. The organization's strategy is to have affiliates in all 50 states by 2020. Steele says the initial aim is for women to achieve 30% representation for women in government, noting evidence suggests this level passes a critical mass to effectively enact institutional change.  Emerge America has had 4,000 graduates, of which more 690 have been elected and are currently serving a political office, as of October 2018.

A’shanti Gholar, the Political Director, said enrollment has increased across the board since the 2016 presidential election, and some classes have seen attendance almost double. Overall, Emerge has seen an 87% increase in the number of applications since the 2016 election. Gholar notes that at the end of 2017, there were 427 women running for a position in the U.S. Congress, compared to 219 women running at the same time in 2015. The organization advised Naquetta Ricks during her successful campaign in 2020 for the Colorado House of Representatives.

Reception 
Hillary Clinton has praised the group as an organization helping to elect Democrats since the 2016 election by using coaching on public speaking, fundraising, networking, and ethical leadership.

References

Democratic Party (United States) organizations
Women's organizations based in the United States
Non-profit organizations based in San Francisco
Organizations established in 2005